Araz Zərgar (also, Araz Zərgər, Araz Zərkar, Araz Zargyar, and Zargyar Vtoroye) is a village and municipality in the Fuzuli District of Azerbaijan.  It has a population of 3,261.

References 

Populated places in Fuzuli District